The 1990–91 NBA season was the 21st season of the National Basketball Association in Cleveland, Ohio. After playing in Italy the previous season, Danny Ferry would make his debut in the NBA, signing a contract with the Cavaliers. However, a year after overcoming injuries to make the playoffs, the Cavaliers were utterly destroyed by injuries again, as Mark Price only played just 16 games due to a torn ACL in his left knee, averaging 16.9 points, 10.4 assists and 2.6 steals per game, and sixth man Hot Rod Williams only played just 43 games due to a foot injury. The team re-signed free agent Darnell Valentine in December as their starting point guard in Price's absence.

The Cavaliers played around .500 early into the season, but as they stood at a 10–8 start, they struggled and lost 16 of their next 17 games, including an 11-game losing streak, and held a 15–32 record at the All-Star break. Despite winning eight out of eleven games in April, the Cavaliers were unable to make the playoffs, finishing 6th in the Central Division with a disappointing 33–49 record.

Brad Daugherty led the team with 21.6 points and 10.9 rebounds per game, and was selected for the 1991 NBA All-Star Game, while Larry Nance averaged 19.2 points, 8.6 rebounds and 2.5 blocks per game, and Williams provided the team with 11.7 points, 6.7 rebounds and 1.6 blocks per game. In addition, Craig Ehlo provided with 10.1 points, 4.6 assists and 1.5 steals per game, while Valentine contributed 9.4 points, 5.4 assists and 1.5 steals per game, Ferry provided with 8.6 points and 3.5 rebounds per game off the bench, and second-year forward Chucky Brown contributed 8.5 points per game. Following the season, Valentine was released to free agency.

Draft picks

 1st round pick (#13) traded to Los Angeles Clippers in Danny Ferry deal. Used to draft Loy Vaught.

Roster

Regular season

Season standings

y - clinched division title
x - clinched playoff spot

z - clinched division title
y - clinched division title
x - clinched playoff spot

Record vs. opponents

Game log

|-style="background:#cfc;"
| 7 || November 13, 1990 || @ Atlanta
| W 121–104
|
|
|
| The Omni10,645
| 4–3
|-style="background:#cfc;"
| 16 || November 30, 1990 || @ Atlanta
| W 101–93
|
|
|
| The Omni11,996
| 9–7

|-style="background:#fcc;"
| 24 || December 17, 1990 || Atlanta
| L 98–109
|
|
|
| Richfield Coliseum11,622
| 10–14

|-style="background:#fcc;"
| 46 || February 5, 1991 || @ Atlanta
| L 114–118
|
|
|
| The Omni11,354
| 15–31

|-style="background:#fcc;"
| 76 || April 9, 1991 || Atlanta
| L 98–104
|
|
|
| Richfield Coliseum15,235
| 28–48

Player stats

Player Statistics Citation:

References

 Cleveland Cavaliers on Database Basketball

Cleveland Cavaliers seasons
Cleve
Cleve